Bacchisa subannulicornis is a species of beetle in the family Cerambycidae. It was described by Breuning in 1964. It is known from Laos.

References

S
Beetles described in 1964